Cheyenne Davide (born 13 July 1992) known as Snoochie Shy is an English radio and television presenter and model. Since 2018, she has presented her own show on BBC Radio 1Xtra. In 2021, she was a contestant on the twenty-first series of I'm a Celebrity...Get Me Out of Here!. In 2022, she will begin presenting The Career Games on BBC Three.

Life and career

Early life and career beginnings
Cheyenne Davide was born on 13 July 1992 in Eltham, London to Kirsty Davide. Her first presenting role was on MTV – The Wrap Up. In 2015, Shy began hosting the breakfast show on Radar, which she did until the suspension of the station in 2018 due to allegations of mistreatment and exploitation of its staff. Shy has also presented the revival edition of Yo! MTV Raps since 2018.

BBC Radio 1Xtra and other projects
In 2018, Shy joined BBC Radio 1 and began presenting a specialist music show every Monday to Thursday from 11pm till 1am on BBC Radio 1Xtra. In 2021, she joined the cast of Celebrity Gogglebox alongside Jeremy Vine. She has also made appearances on the ITV2 panel game shows Don't Hate the Playaz and CelebABility. Shy appeared on The Rap Game UK and has also made an appearance on Tonight with Target. In 2021, she hosted a podcast Slide in with Snoochie, Kaz and Jordan on BBC Sounds along with Love Island contestants Jordan Hames and Kazimir Crossley. In 2022, Shy appeared as a contestant on Celebrity Mastermind. She will also appear on the celebrity version of Hot Property on BBC Three in 2022.

I'm a Celebrity...Get Me Out of Here! and The Career Games
In November 2021, Shy was as a contestant on the twenty-first series of I'm a Celebrity...Get Me Out of Here!. She was the third celebrity to be voted off the show. Shy has a birthmark on her right cheek, and was praised for talking about it during the show.

In February 2022, the BBC announced that Shy would present a new series Hire Me on the relaunched BBC Three channel. The six-part series features candidates trying to secure their dream jobs.

Modelling
Shy is also a model, and has modelled for brands such as Nike, Reebok, UGG, Adidas, Tommy Hilfiger, Warehouse, Vans,  hoodrich womens, Dr. Martens and Missguided.

References

External links
 
 Snoochie Shy (BBC Radio 1Xtra)

BBC Radio 1Xtra presenters
English radio personalities
Living people
1992 births
I'm a Celebrity...Get Me Out of Here! (British TV series) participants
People from Eltham